Racing with the Moon is a 1984 American drama film starring Sean Penn, Elizabeth McGovern, and Nicolas Cage. It was directed by Richard Benjamin and written by Steve Kloves. The original music score was composed by Dave Grusin.

The film's title derives from the 1941 hit song of the same name by Vaughn Monroe.

In 2013, source music and elements of Grusin's score from the film were issued as additional tracks on the CD release of Grusin's music for the soundtrack of  Heaven Can Wait. The love theme, "A Secret Place", also appears on two Grusin recordings, Night Lines and Now Playing, as well as being the title track of a Grover Washington, Jr. release with Grusin playing piano on the session.

Plot
In 1940s Mendocino County, Henry "Hopper" Nash is a small town boy who has been drafted into the U.S. Marine Corps and is about to serve overseas. He is close friends with Nicky, who is also about to be deployed. They have approximately six weeks before shipping out.

Henry and Nicky work together at the bowling alley setting pins, buffing lanes, and working the front counter. Henry sees Caddie Winger at the movie theater taking tickets. He is immediately smitten and conspires with a younger boy to give her flowers. Caddie comes to the soda shop where Henry and Nicky are hanging out. Henry jumps over the counter and pretends that he is working. He follows Caddie to her home and discovers that she lives in an elaborate mansion. He assumes that she is a "Gatsby girl" and is therefore rich. As it turns out, Caddie lives there because her mother is a maid. Later, Henry sees Caddie working at the library. He attempts to get her name but she rebuffs him. At the soda shop, Caddie sets Henry up with one of her friends. Henry meets the others at the skating rink and pretends that he knows how to skate. He ends up crashing but in doing so is able to steal some time with Caddie. She agrees to go on a date with Henry and the two quickly become an item.

Meanwhile, Nicky's girlfriend, Sally Kaiser, is pregnant with his child. He attempts to get $150 from Henry for an abortion. Henry asks Caddie, whom he assumes can easily afford it. Caddie, in an effort to avoid letting Henry down, attempts to steal a pearl necklace from Alice, a young woman who lives at the house at which Caddie resides. She is caught and confesses the reason she needs the necklace. She ends up borrowing the money from Alice. Sally has the abortion and Henry berates Nicky for not being there for his girlfriend. This causes a brief rift that is mended when each realizes that they need each other in order to handle the difficult transition they are about to make. Henry and Caddie also briefly fall out due to the misunderstanding of her status but reconcile and have an emotional goodbye before he leaves.

Ultimately the boys prepare to get on the train taking them away to the war, they wait for it to go by before racing after it and jumping on.

Cast
 Sean Penn as Henry "Hopper" Nash
 Elizabeth McGovern as Caddie Winger
 Nicolas Cage as Nicky
 John Karlen as Mr. Nash
 Rutanya Alda as Mrs. Nash
 Max Showalter as Mr. Arthur
 Bob Maroff as Al
 Crispin Glover as Gatsby Boy
 Barbara Howard as Gatsby Girl
 John Brandon as Mr. Kaiser
 Eve Brent as Mrs. Kaiser
 Suzanne Adkinson as Sally Kaiser
 Shawn Schepps as Gretchen
 Charles Miller as Arnie
 Pat Carroll as Mrs. Spangler
 Al Hopson as Elmer
 Scott McGinnis as Michael
 Kate Williamson as Mrs. Winger
 Michael Madsen as Frank
 Dana Carvey as "Baby Face"
 Michael Talbott as Bill
 Carol Kane as Annie

Reception
As of July 2018, Racing with the Moon holds a rating of 60% on Rotten Tomatoes based on 10 reviews. Roger Ebert's 1984 review gave the film a 3.5 star review and lauded Penn's mature and complex performance.

Accolades
The film is recognized by American Film Institute in these lists:
 2002: AFI's 100 Years...100 Passions – Nominated

References

External links
 
 
 
 

1984 films
1984 comedy films
1984 drama films
1984 comedy-drama films
1980s coming-of-age comedy-drama films
1980s romantic comedy-drama films
1980s teen comedy-drama films
1980s buddy drama films
American coming-of-age comedy-drama films
American romantic comedy-drama films
American teen comedy-drama films
Films directed by Richard Benjamin
Films scored by Dave Grusin
Films set in 1942
Films set in 1943
Films set in California
Films set on the home front during World War II
Films with screenplays by Steve Kloves
Paramount Pictures films
Romantic period films
1980s English-language films
1980s American films